Aqu Urqu (Quechua aqu sand, urqu mountain "sand mountain", also spelled Acco Orcco) is a mountain in the Andes of Peru, about  high. It is located in the Ayacucho Region, Lucanas Province, Chipao District, and in the Sucre Province, Huacaña District. Two lakes named Waytaqucha and Amaruyuq lie at its feet.

References

Mountains of Peru
Mountains of Ayacucho Region